Serpukhovskaya is a Moscow Metro station in the Zamoskvorechye District, Central Administrative Okrug, Moscow, Russia. It is on the Serpukhovsko-Timiryazevskaya Line. The station opened on November 8, 1983. Serpukhovskaya is 43 metres (141 feet) underground. Its name originates from the namesake street, which in turn originates from the historic town of Serpukhov.

Station design
The station features grey and white vaults. There is a three-vault span with white marble lines in the main hallway. The bottoms of the columns holding the ceiling are clad in marble carved so as to look like brick and stone. The shiny textures and surfaces cause intense light reflection. A string of lights hung in the main archway; it was dismantled on 2 March 2006.

Line transfers
Serpukhovskaya offers a transfer to the Dobryninskaya station of the Koltsevaya Line.

References

Moscow Metro stations
Railway stations in Russia opened in 1983
Serpukhovsko-Timiryazevskaya Line
Railway stations located underground in Russia